The Tauber is a river in Franconia (Baden-Württemberg and Bavaria), Germany. The name derives from the Celtic word for water (compare: Dover).

It flows through Rothenburg ob der Tauber, Creglingen, Weikersheim, Bad Mergentheim, Königshofen, Tauberbischofsheim, and flows into the river Main in Wertheim am Main. The Tauber Valley Cycleway is a bicycle path which runs about 101 km along the course of the river.

There is a medieval bridge over the river near Rothenburg ob der Tauber.

See also 

List of rivers of Baden-Württemberg
List of rivers of Bavaria

References 

 
Rivers of Baden-Württemberg
Rivers of Bavaria
Ansbach (district)
Würzburg (district)
Regions of Baden-Württemberg
Rivers of Germany